Antoni Kenar (23 October 1906 – 19 February 1959) was a Polish sculptor. His work was part of the art competitions at the 1932 Summer Olympics and the 1948 Summer Olympics.

References

Further reading
 Witold H. Paryski: Antoni Kenar jako taternik. "Taternik" nr 3-4/1960, pp. 22-24 ( online version)
 Janusz Zdebski: Stary Cmentarz w Zakopanem, Przewodnik biograficzny, Warszawa-Kraków 1986
 Halina Micińska-Kenarowa: Długi wdzięczności, Warszawa, Biblioteka „Więzi”
 Urszula Kenar: Antoni Kenar 1906–1959 (transl. K. Szczepańska-Kowalczuk, E. Slater), Warszawa: Biblioteka Narodowa, 2006,

External links
 

1906 births
1959 deaths
20th-century Polish sculptors
Polish male sculptors
20th-century male artists
Olympic competitors in art competitions
People from Krosno County